Cateel, officially the Municipality of Cateel, is a 2nd class municipality in the province of Davao Oriental, Philippines. According to the 2020 census, it has a population of 44,207 people.

Cateel is the home of the Aliwagwag Falls, located at barangay Aliwagwag within the Aliwagwag Protected Landscape. It is a towering stream of waterfalls considered by hydraulic engineers as the highest in the country and regarded as one of the most beautiful falls in the Philippines. All these in the midst of a virgin forest, a river settles at the foot of the falls with 13 rapids to cross.

History

Cateel is the first municipality in Mindanao. It was the place where Spaniards first docked in Mindanao which reflects how majority of its primary inhabitants converted to Catholicism.

In 1959, Mainit and Alegria were converted into barrios.

The municipality was one of the hardest-hit towns of Typhoon Bopha when it hit the town on December 3, 2012.

Geography

Climate
Cateel has a tropical rainforest climate (Af) with heavy to very heavy rainfall year-round with extremely heavy rainfall in December and January.

Barangays
Cateel is politically subdivided into 16 barangays.

Demographics

Economy

References

External links

 Cateel Profile at the DTI Cities and Municipalities Competitive Index
 [ Philippine Standard Geographic Code]
Philippine Census Information
Local Governance Performance Management System
The Road To Cateel

Municipalities of Davao Oriental